Alfred Wilcox (10 July 1920 – 30 July 1986) was an English cricketer. He played for Gloucestershire between 1939 and 1949.

References

External links

1920 births
1986 deaths
English cricketers
Gloucestershire cricketers
Sportspeople from Cheltenham